Søren Kusk Larsen (born 6 April 1960) is a Danish politician, professional football manager and former player. He represents the Social Democrats in the Aalborg Municipality city council.

Football career
Kusk played football for AaB, where he made more than 150 first team appearances.

His coaching career started with a number of smaller coaching jobs at AaB, both as an assistant and in the youth department, before becoming head coach of Aalborg Chang in 1994. Afterwards, he also coached Viborg FF and AaB.

In 2005, he won promotion with SønderjyskE to the Danish Superliga, but stepped down from his position coach after being arrested for driving under the influence of alcohol.

In January 2008, he was hired as a talent coordinator for AaB, but stopped, after mutual agreement with AaB, due to alcoholism which prevented him from carrying out his job.

Political career
In 2017, he was elected to the Aalborg Municipality council as a Social Democrat.

References

External links

 AaB Oltimers Profile

1960 births
Living people
Danish men's footballers
Danish football managers
Thisted FC players
AaB Fodbold players
Viborg FF managers
AaB Fodbold managers
SønderjyskE Fodbold managers
People from Thisted
Association footballers not categorized by position
Jammerbugt FC managers
Aalborg Chang managers
Vendsyssel FF managers
Sportspeople from the North Jutland Region